Berkmar High School is a high school located in Lilburn, Georgia, United States. It has approximately 2,912 students, grades 9 through 12.

Berkmar High School's principal is Durrant Williams.

The school opened in 1966 to help overcrowding at nearby schools due to the growth of Gwinnett County.

Description
Middle schools such as Berkmar Middle School and Sweetwater Middle School pour into BHS.

In 2002 Berkmar received a renovation with a new front entrance to the school, a gymnasium, a two-story building to hold offices, classrooms, a media center, and an improved parking lot.

Berkmar has three buildings of classrooms, two gyms, a theater, and many portable classrooms. Adjacent to the football field are a baseball field, hitting facility, softball field, practice field, and four tennis courts. A football training facility has been built in a former parking area. The new football training room has also helped with the overcrowding of classrooms.

Academics
Berkmar operates an Advanced Placement (AP) program. The school won the 2008 Inspiration Award from the College Board for its high numbers, and had the 2010 and 2013 female Georgia State AP Scholars. The title of State AP Scholar is granted to one male and one female student in each U.S. state and the District of Columbia, with scores of 3 or higher on the greatest number of AP exams, and then the highest average score (at least 3.5) on all AP exams taken.

Berkmar also participates in the QuestBridge scholarship program, a non-profit program that aims to link high-achieving, low-income students with educational and scholarship opportunities at U.S. colleges and universities. It includes the National College Match program for high school seniors.

Extracurricular activities
Berkmar High School has an active choral program.  The students put on many shows during the course of the year. In October, the choirs put on a fall concert performance that includes classical choir pieces.

The school's Academic Decathlon team has seen success at the state level. The team held the title of Georgia State Championships for six consecutive years (2003–2008).  In 2009, Berkmar did not make it to the Nationals, but won first in their division. In 2012, the team served as state co-champions with neighboring Parkview High School, and traveled to Minneapolis for the national championship.

Other clubs and groups include National Honor Society, Quiz Bowl, Student Council, Berkmar Beamers, Book Club, Latin Club, French Club, Math Club, Future Educators Association, Beta Club, Multi-Cultural Club, and Sew 'N Sews Club.

Athletics
Berkmar competes in Region 7, Class AAAAAAA, the largest classification for Georgia high schools. Region 7, a geographical designation, includes Brookwood High School, Meadowcreek High School, and Parkview High School.

Sports practised at the school include baseball, basketball, cheerleading, cross country, American football, golf, soccer, softball, swimming and diving, tennis, track and field, volleyball, flag football and wrestling.

Notable alumni
 Kirshnik Ball, Migos rapper known as Takeoff
 Kiari Cephus, Migos rapper known as Offset
 Troy Davis, football linebacker
 Amber Nash, voice actor
 Quavious Marshall, Migos rapper known as Quavo
 Steve Whitmire, Muppet puppeteer with The Jim Henson Company and Sesame Workshop

References

External links
Official website
Sports
Berkmar Band
Gwinnett County Public Schools

Educational institutions established in 1966
Public high schools in Georgia (U.S. state)
Schools in Gwinnett County, Georgia
1966 establishments in Georgia (U.S. state)